Charles Frederick Joy (December 11, 1849 – April 13, 1921) was a U.S. Representative from Missouri.

Biography
Born in Jacksonville, Illinois on December 11, 1849, Joy attended the public schools. He was graduated from Yale College in 1874.

He studied law, and was admitted to the bar and commenced practice in St. Louis, Missouri in 1876.
He was presented credentials as a Republican Member-elect to the Fifty-third Congress and served until April 3, 1894, when he was succeeded by John J. O'Neill, who contested the election.

He married Arabel Ordway in Salem, Connecticut on 1879. She died during the birth of their only child.

He remarried, to Elizabeth Ina Grant, a native of Boston Highlands, Massachusetts. She descended from the Grants and Lennoxes of England, and spent the greater part of her girlhood abroad, returning to Boston in 1872. Since 1889 her family resided in California, where, on May 11, 1895, she and Charles F. Joy were married in San Mateo.

Joy was elected to the Fifty-fourth and to the three succeeding Congresses (March 4, 1895 – March 3, 1903).
He was an unsuccessful candidate for renomination in 1902.
He resumed the practice of his profession in St. Louis.
He served as recorder of deeds from 1907 until March 22, 1921, when he resigned.
He died in St. Louis, Missouri, on April 13, 1921. His remains were cremated and placed in Elks Rest at Bellefontaine Cemetery.

References

Specific

1849 births
1921 deaths
Lawyers from St. Louis
People from Jacksonville, Illinois
Politicians from St. Louis
Republican Party members of the United States House of Representatives from Missouri
Yale College alumni
19th-century American lawyers